Mr. B is an album by trumpeter Chet Baker which was recorded in 1983 and released on the Dutch Timeless label.

Reception 

The Allmusic review states "There is a sadness permeating the trumpeter's sound throughout, exacerbated by the lazy, sometimes sluggish, tempos. A deep and touching beauty can be felt, marking this as one of Chet's best from the period".

Track listing 
 "Dolphin Dance" (Herbie Hancock) – 6:23
 "Ellen and David" (Charlie Haden) – 6:18
 "Strollin'" (Horace Silver) – 7:24
 "In Your Own Sweet Way" (Dave Brubeck) – 7:17
 "Mister B" (Hal Galper) – 4:08
 "Beatrice" (Sam Rivers) – 4:49
 "White Blues" (Michel Graillier) – 5:02 Bonus track on CD release
 "Father X-Mas" (Graillier) – 5:01 Bonus track on CD release

Personnel 
Chet Baker – trumpet
Michel Graillier – piano
Riccardo del Fra – bass
Philip Catherine – guitar (track 8)

References 

Chet Baker albums
1983 albums
Timeless Records albums